Fábio Alexander Freitas de Almeida (born 7 July 1996), known as Fabinho, is a Brazilian professional footballer who plays as a central midfielder for Ponte Preta, on loan from Ukrainian Premier League club Metalist 1925 Kharkiv.

Club career
In July 2021, Fabinho switched to Ukrainian club Metalist 1925 Kharkiv.

References

External links
 Statistics at UAF website (Ukr)
 

1996 births
Living people
Footballers from Rio de Janeiro (city)
Brazilian footballers
Brazilian expatriate footballers
Association football midfielders
C.D. Pinhalnovense players
CR Vasco da Gama players
FC Olimpik Donetsk players
FK Ventspils players
FC Metalist 1925 Kharkiv players
Associação Atlética Ponte Preta players
Ukrainian Premier League players
Ukrainian First League players
Latvian Higher League players
Expatriate footballers in Ukraine
Expatriate footballers in Portugal
Expatriate footballers in Latvia
Brazilian expatriate sportspeople in Portugal
Brazilian expatriate sportspeople in Ukraine
Brazilian expatriate sportspeople in Latvia